Chaku is a Newari cuisine made from concentrated sugarcane juice, jaggery, ghee, and nuts. The mixture is cooked down until it is a solid form, and then pulled on a hook in a manner similar to making taffy and then cut into small rolls, or it may be cooked in a shallow dish and cut into small diamond shaped pieces. Chaku may be eaten separately, or it can also used in making Yomari (योमरी).
 

Chaku is served by Nepalese with ghee and yams during the festival of Maghe Sankranti.

See also
 List of Nepalese dishes

References

Nepalese cuisine